Yosef "Bomba" Tzur (né Yosef Welzer; 26 December 1928 in Haifa – 21 March 1979 in Herzliya) was an Israeli theatre and film actor, screenwriter, producer, and comedian. 

Tzur is best remembered for his roles in the films Dalia And The Sailors (1964), Hole in the Moon (1964), Trunk to Cairo (1965), Fortuna (1966), Blaumilch Canal (1969), and Big Gus, What's the Fuss? (1973). 

He was a recipient of the Kinor David award.

See also
Culture of Israel
Cinema of Israel

References 

1928 births
1979 deaths
Male actors from Haifa
Israeli male film actors
Israeli male stage actors
Israeli male comedians
Israeli male screenwriters
20th-century Israeli male actors
20th-century Israeli screenwriters
20th-century Israeli comedians